Cubi XV is an abstract stainless steel sculpture by David Smith. It is part of collection of the San Diego Museum of Art, and installed in Balboa Park's May S. Marcy Sculpture Garden. The statue is part of Smith's Cubi series.

References

1960s sculptures
Abstract sculptures in California
Outdoor sculptures in San Diego
Sculptures by David Smith
Sculptures of the San Diego Museum of Art
Stainless steel sculptures in the United States
Steel sculptures in California